Constantine Michael Louloudis  (born 15 September 1991) is a Greek-British rower. He is an Olympic champion and a two time world champion.

Personal life
Constantine was a King's Scholar at Eton College, an all-boys public school in Eton, Berkshire. He studied Classics at Trinity College, Oxford, and graduated with a first class Bachelor of Arts (BA) degree.

His father is Greek and comes from the island of Andros. His mother is The Honourable Madeleine Louloudis CVO, a Lady-in-Waiting to Princess Anne, and daughter of the late 20th Viscount Dillon.

Rowing career
Constantine learned to row at Eton and in 2009 he stroked the Eton VIII that won at Henley Royal Regatta, the National Schools Regatta and the Schools' Head.

He was in the six seat of the winning Oxford Blue boat at the 2011 Oxford-Cambridge Boat Race. Later in 2011, he won the Men's Pairs, with George Nash, at the FISA World Rowing Under 23 Championships on the Bosbaan on 24 July 2011 in Amsterdam, Netherlands.

He took a year out of his studies to train for and compete at the 2012 Summer Olympics, winning a bronze medal in the men's eight. Louloudis then returned to his Oxford studies, rowing in the winning eights of a second and third Boat Race in 2013 and 2014, before returning to the British eight, which he stroked to a gold medal at the 2014 World Rowing Championships. The next year he won a final Boat Race as president of Oxford University Boat Club. He was part of the British team that topped the medal table at the 2015 World Rowing Championships at Lac d'Aiguebelette in France, where he won a gold medal as part of the eight with Matt Gotrel, Pete Reed, Paul Bennett, Moe Sbihi, Alex Gregory, George Nash, Will Satch and Phelan Hill.

At the 2016 Olympic games in Rio de Janeiro, Louloudis rounded off his medal collection by stroking the GB men's 4- to gold, the fifth consecutive time a British crew had won the event.

Post Rowing

In 2022 he was part of the commentary team for the BBC's coverage of the Boat Race.

Honours
Louloudis was awarded the MBE in the Queen's 2017 New Year Honours list for services to rowing.

References

1991 births
Living people
Alumni of Trinity College, Oxford
British people of Greek descent
British male rowers
Olympic gold medallists for Great Britain
Olympic bronze medallists for Great Britain
Olympic medalists in rowing
Olympic rowers of Great Britain
People educated at Eton College
Rowers at the 2012 Summer Olympics
Rowers at the 2016 Summer Olympics
Rowers from Greater London
Medalists at the 2012 Summer Olympics
Medalists at the 2016 Summer Olympics
English male rowers
World Rowing Championships medalists for Great Britain
Members of the Order of the British Empire